Rabbitt is the third studio album by American country music artist Eddie Rabbitt, released in 1977 under the Elektra Records label. The album produced the singles "We Can't Go on Living Like This" and "I Can't Help Myself" which peaked at 6 and 2, respectively, on the United States country singles chart.

Rabbitt was re-released along with his debut album Eddie Rabbitt in 2006.

Track listing

Personnel
Eddie Rabbitt - acoustic guitar, lead vocals, backing vocals
 Sonny Garrish - steel guitar
 Steve Gibson - electric guitar
 Larrie Londin - drums
 Kenny Malone - drums
 Farrell Morris - percussion
 Hargus "Pig" Robbins - piano
 Mike Suttle - background vocals
 Bobby Thompson - acoustic guitar
 Jack Williams - bass guitar
 Reggie Young - electric guitar

Chart positions

Singles

References

1977 albums
Eddie Rabbitt albums
Albums produced by David Malloy
Elektra Records albums